The Binigura people, these days usually spelt Pinikura, are an Aboriginal Australian people of the Pilbara region of Western Australia.

Country
Their northern boundary lay around the areas of Mount Amy, Urandy, and the start of the Duck Creek uplands. Their eastern confine is traced to the lower headwaters of the Hardey River, on the western edges of Ashburton Downs.

Native title
The Puutu Kunti Kurrama and Pinikura, who are two separate but related peoples, lodged a joint claim for recognition for each of their own countries as well as a shared area. The PKKP Aboriginal Corporation is the representative body administering the lands for both peoples.

Language

The Binigura/Pinikura language is a close relative of the Thalanyji language.

Social organisation
Although each group is distinct, the Kurruma and Pinikura peoples observe common laws and customs, and share and protect much of the same land and resources.

Juukan Gorge destruction

The Pinikura people, in alliance with the Puutu Kunti Kurrama in a group abbreviated as PKKP, were distressed by the destruction of a sacred and heritage site in the form of a cave in Juukan Gorge by mining giant Rio Tinto in May 2020.

Alternative names
Other variants of the name as supplied by Tindale are:
 Biniguru
 Binnigoora
 Binnigora
 Pinikurra

Notes

Citations

Sources

External links

Aboriginal peoples of Western Australia